Bjorn Thorsrud (October 7, 1963 – October 19, 2021) was an American music producer, programmer, and audio engineer who produced film scores and albums for rock and pop artists.

He  also engineered, mixed, or contributed production or programming to every Smashing Pumpkins record from 1998's Adore to 2012's Oceania. He previously worked for the Taj-Motown Record Company and established his own record label, Tri Records. He held a bachelor's degree in physics and music from the University of Nevada, Reno.

Thorsrud worked with artists including Billy Corgan, David Coverdale, The Dandy Warhols, Bruce Dickinson, Marianne Faithfull, The Frogs, Monster Magnet, Sleeping at Last, The Smashing Pumpkins, Asphalt Socialites, Whitesnake, and Zwan.

He lived in his hometown of Las Vegas, Nevada.

On October 19, 2021, he died suddenly of unreported causes. He was 58 years of age.

Discography

References

External links
Discogs page

1963 births
2021 deaths
American audio engineers
University of Nevada, Reno alumni
American people of Norwegian descent
Record producers from Nevada
Place of birth missing
Place of death missing